88 Precepts is a document written by David Lane, a member of the White separatist insurrection cell The Order. Written while Lane was serving a 190-year prison sentence, "88 Precepts" is a treatise on natural law, religious philosophy, race, and politics — elementary principles behind the two "Fourteen Words" slogans.  Lane promoted limited government, servant leadership, taxation as theft, a Deistic theological view, was anti-democracy, rejected racial integration as a "euphemism" for "White genocide" and sought to establish "exclusively White racial territorial imperatives" in North America and in Eastern Europe. "88 Precepts" is one of several key texts, printed and distributed through 14 Word Press, including the "White Genocide Manifesto" (which contained 14 key points).

Lane claimed that 14-88 was an integral part of coding in his "Pyramid Prophecy" (which taught the belief that Lane was the "666 Sun Man" and America was the "Beast") and fundamental to his neo-pagan religion Wotanism (with "88 Lines and 14 Words" being a supplement to 88 Precepts). 1488 is a combination of 14 as in Lane's Fourteen Words and 88 as a reference to his 88 Precepts.

As in his other writings, including his "fourteen words," Lane repeats the claim that white people are threatened by a lack of exclusive territorial hegemony and "forced racial mixing".

Consistent with the restrictive gender roles which were practiced within Aryan Nations, of which Lane was a member, precept 35 of "88 Precepts" regards homosexuality as unnatural and it also views sex as an act of reproduction which should be performed for the sole purpose of increasing the size of the white population. Lane views sex as a motivation for male subjugation of women, who are expected to be subservient. Lane advises men to subjugate women via power and control of territory, and he also advises white men to take arms for this purpose.

According to its web site, the United Klans of America viewed the 88 Precepts as "a source for which we can ascertain lasting truths". In his own writings, David Eden Lane rejected the KKK, National Socialism and America as part of the Zionist conspiracy as well as Christianity itself.

References

External links 
88 Precepts

Neo-Nazi concepts
Neo-Nazism in the United States